The 1977 Gael Linn Cup, the most important representative competition for elite level participants in the women's team field sport of camogie, was played at junior level only in the three years 1975-7. It was won by Munster, who defeated Connacht in the final, played at Adare.

Arrangements
Connacht defeated Leinster by 2–3 to 1–5 at Russell Park, Blanchardstown. Munster defeated Ulster 6–4 to 1–3 at Carrickmacross. Using nine Limerick players who had won the All-Ireland junior championship, Munster led by five points at halftime in the final and defeated Connacht 3–7 to 3–1.

Final stages

|}

References

External links
 Camogie Association

1977 in camogie
1977